Sant'Agata Bolognese is a small comune in the Metropolitan City of Bologna, Emilia-Romagna, in the north of Italy. It is notable for being the headquarters of the luxury automobile manufacturer Automobili Lamborghini.

It is named after Saint Agatha of Sicily.

References

Cities and towns in Emilia-Romagna